Claude Treglown (13 February 1893 – 7 May 1980) was an English cricketer. He played for Essex between 1922 and 1928.

References

External links

1893 births
1980 deaths
English cricketers
Essex cricketers
People from Herne Bay, Kent
Norfolk cricketers
Sportspeople from Kent